Peter Joseph Egan (born 28 September 1946) is a British actor and animal rights activist. 

He is known for his television roles, including Hogarth in Big Breadwinner Hog, the future George IV of the United Kingdom in Prince Regent (1979); smooth neighbour Paul Ryman in the sitcom Ever Decreasing Circles (1984–89); and Hugh "Shrimpie" MacClare, Marquess of Flintshire, in Downton Abbey (2012–15).

Early life
Egan was born on 28 September 1946 in Hampstead, London, the son of Doris (née Pick) and Michael Thomas Egan, who is of Irish descent. He was educated at St George's Catholic School, Maida Vale. He also attended the London Oratory School and the Royal Academy of Dramatic Art.

Life and career
Egan's first stage performance was in Charlie Girl. His first television role was as the sex-and-cinema-obsessed Seth Starkadder in a BBC serialisation of Cold Comfort Farm (1968). In 1969, he had come to notoriety as the acid-throwing gangster Hogarth in the controversial Granada series Big Breadwinner Hog. Later, he had other starring roles: as John Everett Millais in the BBC serial The Love School (1975); as Oscar Wilde in the serial Lillie (1978), starring Francesca Annis as Lillie Langtry; as Magnus Pym in the BBC dramatisation of John le Carré's A Perfect Spy (1987) and another BBC sitcom, Joint Account (1989–90).

Egan played the title role in the BBC series Prince Regent (1979), and was a sinister immortal Knight Templar in Michael J. Bird's BBC series The Dark Side of the Sun (1983). Egan also played Fothergill in the television series Reilly, Ace of Spies (1983). In 1986, he had the role of Henry Simcox in the television dramatization of John Mortimer's Paradise Postponed. In 1988, he narrated the Video 125 drivers eye view 1066DC, which was a cab ride in a Network Southeast class 411 4CEP EMU from Hastings to London. He also guest-starred in episodes of The Ruth Rendell Mysteries ("A New Lease of Death," 1991) and A Touch of Frost ("Private Lives," 1999).

Other roles have included the character Michael Cochrane in the programme The Ambassador (1998), and (on film) as the suave secret agent Meres in television spin-off Callan (1974), and the Duke of Sutherland in Chariots of Fire (1981). In 2007, Egan took the role of Victor in the film Death at a Funeral. In 2009, he toured as lead Sir Hugo Latymer in Nikolai Foster's revival of Noël Coward's A Song at Twilight. He is the narrator for the US and UK versions of Forza Motorsport 3 and its sequel, Forza Motorsport 4.

In 2012, Egan first appeared as Hugh "Shrimpie" MacClare, Marquess of Flintshire, in the Christmas special episode of ITV's Downton Abbey. For the drama's fifth series, Shrimpie became a recurring character; he also briefly appeared in series six. Later that same year, Egan appeared in Alan Bennett's People, alongside Frances de la Tour, at the National Theatre.

Also in 2012, he narrated a new recording of Rick Wakeman's album, Journey to the Centre of the Earth, based on the story by Jules Verne.

Animal rights activism
Egan is a longtime animal lover and vegan. Starting in 2010, he began to campaign publicly on behalf of animal rights.

Egan is an ambassador for the dog rescue Saving Suffering Strays in Sarajevo, Bosnia. He and his wife Myra adopted their Bosnian dog Tidus from this dog rescue. He continues to give support to stray street dogs of Sarajevo and their lone rescuer Milena Malesevic.

Egan is an active ambassador for the Animals Asia Foundation, which is a charity that works to end cruelty to animals in Asia. He is also patron of "All Dogs Matter", a dog rescue and rehoming charity in and around London and Norfolk.

In May 2015, Egan became Patron of Chaldon Animal Sanctuary, a charity that offers homes for life for dogs and cats. Egan personally took one of the Bosnian dogs now named Crusoe to the sanctuary in May. Three months later, Egan was announced as patron of the science-based campaign For Life On Earth (FLOE), which fights against animal testing in the field of human medical research.

In January 2016, Egan participated in Veganuary, and has remained vegan.

In 2018 Peter Egan joined Animal Equality UK inside a foie gras farm in France to document the process of force-feeding. Since then, he has supported the animal protection organisation on its campaign to ban the import of foie gras made by force-feeding in the UK.

Personal life
Egan was married to former actress Myra Frances for 49 years until her death from cancer on 30 March 2021. His stepdaughter is Rebecca Egan.

Filmography

References

External links

 Peter Egan Interview

1946 births
20th-century English male actors
21st-century English male actors
Alumni of RADA
BAFTA Most Promising Newcomer to Leading Film Roles winners
English animal rights activists
English male film actors
English male television actors
English people of Irish descent
Living people
Male actors from London
People from Hampstead